At the 1900 Summer Olympics in Paris, many shooting events were featured within the concurrent 1900 Exposition Universelle, but only eight events currently are considered as "Olympic" by IOC. Before July 2021 the International Olympic Committee has never decided which events were "Olympic" and which were not. The competitions were held from 3 August to 5 August and took place at the military sporting complex in Satory and at Boulogne-Billancourt.  According to Olympic historian Bill Mallon, one of these nine shooting events (20 metre military pistol) was an event for professionals with prize money and therefore does not meet inclusion criteria for 1900 Olympic Games events.

Medal summary

Event that currently is not considered as "Olympic" by IOC.

Excluded events

Competitors in these events had to kill as many live pigeons as possible. Birds were released one at a time from 'traps' in front of the shooters; winners were determined by whoever shot the most birds out of the sky. A shooter was eliminated once they missed two birds. Nearly 300 birds were killed. A prize purse of up to 20,000 Francs was awarded to the winners, though the top four finishers agreed to split the winnings. This was the first and only time in Olympic history when animals were killed on purpose. Animal rights campaigns were mounted to stop live shooting; in 1902 bans came into force in the United States leading to the introduction of clay pigeons. The following results are not included in the IOC Olympic results list:

Live pigeon shooting – 20 franc entrance fee

Live pigeon shooting – 200 franc entrance fee

Running game target

Participating nations
A total of 72 shooters from 8 nations competed at the Paris Games:

Medal table
20 metre military pistol event was an event for professionals with prize money. All three medals in this event were won by the French. It is not included in the IOC website's list of medal results and is not included in the table below.

References

Bibliography
 International Olympic Committee medal winners database
   Retrieved 2 March 2006.
 

 
1900 Summer Olympics events
1900
Olympics
Olympics